Kelly Smith is a Paralympian athlete from Canada competing mainly in category T54 long-distance events.

Kelly first competed in the Paralympics in 2000 in Sydney competing in the 5000m, 10000m and marathon as well as part of the Canadian 4 × 400 m relay team.  He also competed in the 2004 Summer Paralympics in Athens again in the 1500m, 5000m and marathon, this time winning a silver medal in the marathon.

References

Athletes (track and field) at the 2000 Summer Paralympics
Athletes (track and field) at the 2004 Summer Paralympics
Living people
Paralympic track and field athletes of Canada
Paralympic silver medalists for Canada
Medalists at the 2004 Summer Paralympics
Year of birth missing (living people)
Paralympic medalists in athletics (track and field)
Canadian male wheelchair racers